"Jesus in Disguise" is a song by Christian contemporary-alternative rock musician Brandon Heath from his fourth studio album, Blue Mountain. It was released on August 10, 2012, as the first single from the album.

Background 
This song was produced by Dan Muckala.

Composition 
"Jesus in Disguise" was written by Brandon Heath, Ross Copperman and Lee Thomas Miller.

Release 
The song "Jesus in Disguise" was digitally released as the lead single from Blue Mountain on August 10, 2012.

Music video
Heath release his video on September 8, 2012 via YouTube and VEVO. He got the attention of 324,111 of viewers in 2 months. Compared to secular music, according to him Heath did not compare his music in worldly.

Charts

References 

2012 singles
Brandon Heath songs
Songs written by Ross Copperman
Songs written by Brandon Heath
Songs written by Lee Thomas Miller
Song recordings produced by Dan Muckala
2012 songs